= Saleh Fouzan =

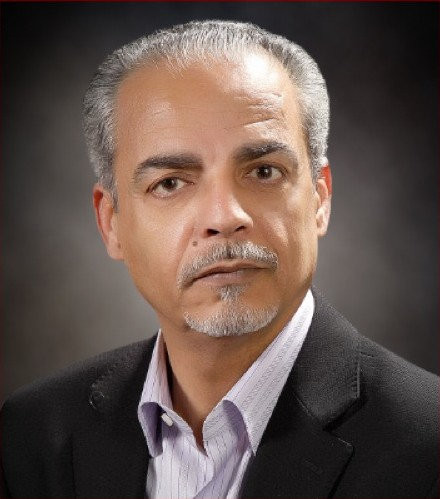
- Born: February , 1956; Riyadh, Saudi Arabia
- Occupation: Cinematographer

Saleh Fouzan (Arabic: صالح فوزان; born February, 1956) is a cinematographer. He has produced 34 feature films through his company Shamel Media Production & Distribution.

== Biography ==
Fouzan was born in Riyadh, Saudi Arabia in February 1956. As an immigrant working in Egypt from 1986 until 1997, he had produced 34 feature films through his company Shamel Media Production & Distribution.

== Education and experience ==
- Dramatic Construction Workshops, Brussels, Belgium, 1996-1997, Script writing workshops
- Personal research, 2000-2003, Cinema Direction
- Professional experience in cinema production and distribution, 30 years
- Visiting lecturer in the Lebanese German University , 2007-2009, Institute for the Performing Arts

== Productions ==
- DEKE AL-BARABER DIRECTOR Hessian Kamal EGYPT
- ATABAT ALSITAT DIRECTOR Ali Abdulkhalig EGYPT
- RAGHABAT DIRECTOR Kareem Thia Alden EGYPT
- ALHUB WALRAUB DIRECTOR Kareem Thia Alden EGYPT
- WATAMAT AQUALLUH DIRECTOR Majdy Muharram EGYPT
- RAJEL MUHIM JEDA DIRECTOR Aussam Alshmaa EGYPT
- MASSRAA ALTHIAB DIRECTOR Ahmad Saqer EGYPT
- REJAL BILLATHAMAN DIRECTOR Abdullhadi Taha EGYPT
- KALABSHAT DIRECTOR Ahmad Saqer EGYPT
- FIKH ALTHAALIP DIRECTOR Mohamed Marzooq EGYPT
- TAEAQ ALSHARR DIRECTOR Mohamed Marzooq EGYPT
- MUHIMA FIMUNTASIF ALLIAL DIRECTOR Maha Arram EGYPT
- MUZIAA BARIDE DIRECTOR Maha Arram EGYPT
- HARAM LILEAJAR DIRECTOR Maha Arram EGYPT
- JIDAAN AL-HILMIAH DIRECTOR Najdy Hafith EGYPT
- LU KUNT MAKANI DIRECTOR Shariff Hamoudah EGYPT
- LIAL WARIJAL DIRECTOR Shariff Hamoudah EGYPT
- AHLA MENALSARAF MAFISH DIRECTOR Samir Hafith EGYPT
- BALTEAH BENT BAHRRY DIRECTOR Salah Sirry EGYPT
- ZAMAN AL-AQUIA DIRECTOR Ahmaed Throat EGYPT
- THAT ALRABAA DIRECTOR Shariff Hamoudah EGYPT
- KHAMIS YGHZO AL-QAHIRAH DIRECTOR Said Saif EGYPT
- KHIANAH DIRECTOR Shariff Hamoudah EGYPT
- GHARAMEAT SAIAS DIRECTOR Samir Hafith EGYPT

== Co-productions ==
- WILLAD AL-AIHE DIRECTOR Sheriff Yahia EGYPT
- YA NAS YA HOUH DIRECTOR Atiff Salem EGYPT
- ALMUAALIMAH SAMAH DIRECTOR Mohamed Abdulaziz EGYPT
- LILATE ASSAAL DIRECTOR Mohamed Abdulaziz EGYPT
- AL-AQRAAB DIRECTOR Adel Auadh EGYPT
- ALSAQUDE DIRECTOR Adel Alaasser EGYPT
- IHNA ILLY SARAQNA
- ALHARRAMIA DIRECTOR Midhat Alsubaay EGYPT
- AUDAT AL- HARRIB DIRECTOR Yussif Abu Saif EGYPT
- AL-KATHAB WASAHIBAH DIRECTOR Ahmad Tharout EGYPT
- ALAAB BELNAAR DIRECTOR Nasser Hussein EGYPT
- QAUAIL ALRUMMAN
- (LES SIESTES GRENADINES) DIRECTOR Mahmood Ben Mahmood TUNISIA

== Scripts ==
- The Years of Mercy, SAUDI ARABIA
- Rutrut (Muddy)(The Swamp)

== Direction ==
- QAUAIL ALRUMMAN(LES SIESTES GRENADINES), TUNISIA, Assistant director (Trainee)
- The Years of Mercy, SAUDI ARABIA, Director
